Out of the Rain is a 1991 film directed by Gary Winick. The film starred Bridget Fonda and Michael O'Keefe.

Plot
In upstate New York Jimmy Reade is thought to have committed suicide with a shotgun. His older brother Frank comes home to attend the funeral. The older brother moves into the deceased brother's trailer home. He then begins to learn about his deceased brother's involvement in narcotics.

Production
The film was directed and produced by Gary Winick. The screenplay was written by Shem Bitterman. The film starred Bridget Fonda and Michael O'Keefe. It was filmed in upstate New York.

Reception
In a 1990 review, TV Guide said that the film, "offers only superficial cynicism, small-time film noir with nothing to say. Characters and performances alike are one-note downers."

References

External links

1991 films
Films directed by Gary Winick
1991 drama films
American drama films
1990s English-language films
1990s American films